Amphilochius may refer to:

 Saint Amphilochius, 2nd-century Illyrian martyr
 Amphilochius of Iconium, 4th-century bishop and saint
 Amphilochius of Sida, 5th-century bishop
 Amphilochius of Pochayiv (Amfilokhiy; 1894–1971), Ukrainian Orthodox priest and saint
 Amphilochius of Montenegro (Amfilohije; 1938–2020), Serb Orthodox metropolitan

See also
 Amfilochia, place in ancient and modern Greece
 Amphilochus (disambiguation)
 Saint Amphilochius (Konya), former church in present-day Turkey